Westfield is an unincorporated community in Warren Township, St. Joseph County, in the U.S. state of Indiana.

The community is part of the South Bend–Mishawaka, IN-MI, Metropolitan Statistical Area.

Geography

References

Unincorporated communities in St. Joseph County, Indiana
Unincorporated communities in Indiana
South Bend – Mishawaka metropolitan area